John Humble may refer to:

Baronets
Sir John Humble, 4th Baronet (1680–1724) of the Humble Baronets
Sir John Humble, 6th Baronet (c. 1739–1745) of the Humble Baronets
Sir John Nugent Humble, 1st Baronet (1785–1834) of the Nugent baronets
Sir John Nugent Humble, 2nd Baronet (1818–1886) of the Nugent baronets
Sir John Nugent Nugent, 3rd Baronet (1849–1929) of the Nugent baronets

Others
John Humble (hoaxer), also known as Wearside Jack, British man who pretended to be the Yorkshire Ripper (Peter Sutcliffe)
John Humble (footballer)